Reynolds Township is a civil township of Montcalm County in the U.S. state of Michigan. The population was 4,279 at the 2000 census.

Communities
Conger is an unincorporated place established in 1872.
 Howard City is a village located within the township.

Geography

Demographics
As of the census of 2000, there were 4,279 people, 1,534 households, and 1,142 families residing in the township. The racial makeup of the township was 96.24% White, 0.47% African American, 0.56% Native American, 0.14% Asian, 0.02% Pacific Islander, 0.44% from other races, and 2.13% from two or more races. Hispanic or Latino of any race were 1.66% of the population.

There were 1,534 households, out of which 38.3% had children under the age of 18 living with them, 58.7% were married couples living together, 11.1% had a female householder with no husband present, and 25.5% were non-families. 20.7% of all households were made up of individuals, and 8.3% had someone living alone who was 65 years of age or older.  The average household size was 2.79 and the average family size was 3.17.

In the township the population was spread out, with 31.0% under the age of 18, 7.8% from 18 to 24, 30.6% from 25 to 44, 21.4% from 45 to 64, and 9.1% who were 65 years of age or older.  The median age was 33 years. For every 100 females, there were 95.2 males.  For every 100 females age 18 and over, there were 94.3 males.

The median income for a household in the township was $40,799, and the median income for a family was $45,046. Males had a median income of $32,367 versus $22,157 for females. The per capita income for the township was $15,589.  About 7.8% of families and 11.6% of the population were below the poverty line, including 15.9% of those under age 18 and 8.7% of those age 65 or over.

Education
Tri County Area Schools, including Tri County High School, serves the community.

References

External links
 Reynolds Township, Michigan

Townships in Montcalm County, Michigan
Townships in Michigan